Nyland and Tavastehus County was a county of the Swedish Empire in Finland from 1634 to 1809.

In 1775 whole northern part of the county (later Central Finland region) was transferred to the new Vasa County. Also a part of historical Satakunta was added to the Nyland and Tavastehus County from the Åbo and Björneborg County, while Upper Hollola was transferred to the new Kymmenegård County.

By the Treaty of Fredrikshamn in 1809 Sweden ceded all its territories in Finland, east of the Torne River, to Russia. The county still continued to exist as a province of the new autonomic Grand Duchy of Finland until 1831, when it was split to Häme Province and Uusimaa Province.

Maps

Governors
Arvid Göransson Horn af Kanckas 1634–1640 
Arvid Göransson Horn af Kanckas 1640–1648 (Tavastehus County) 
Reinhold Mettstake 1640–1642 (Nyland County) 
Jacob Uggla 1642–1648 (Nyland County) 
Erik Andersson Oxe 1648–1652
Ernst Johan Greutz 1652–1666
Udde Knutsson Ödell 1666–1668
Axel Eriksson Stålarm 1668–1678
Axel Rosenhane 1678–1685
Jonas Klingstedt 1685–1687
Karl Bonde 1687–1695
Mårten Lindhielm 1695–1696
Abraham Cronhjort 1696–1703
Johan Creutz 1703–1719
Per Stierncrantz 1719–1737
Axel Erik Gyllenstierna af Lundholm 1737–1746
Gustaf Samuel Gylleborg 1746–1756
Anders Johan Nordenskjöld 1756–1761
Hans Erik Boije af Gennäs 1761–1772
Carl Ribbing af Koberg 1773
Anders Henrik Ramsay 1774–1776
Anders de Bruce 1777–1786
Carl Gustaf Armfelt 1787–1788
Johan Henrik Munck 1790–1809
Gustaf Fredrik Stiernwall 1810–1815
Gustaf Hjärne 1816–1828
Carl Klick 1828–1831

Former counties of Sweden
Former provinces of Finland
1634 establishments in Sweden